The Braille pattern dots-235 is a 6-dot braille cell with dots  raised, or an 8-dot braille cell with  raised. It is represented by the Unicode code point U+2816, and in Braille ASCII with the number 6.

Unified Braille

In unified international braille, the braille pattern dots-235 is used to represent an exclamation point, other punctuation, and otherwise assigned as needed.

Table of unified braille values

† Abolished in Unified English Braille

Other braille

Plus dots 7 and 8

Related to Braille pattern dots-235 are Braille patterns 2357, 2358, and 23578, which are used in 8-dot braille systems, such as Gardner-Salinas and Luxembourgish Braille.

Related 8-dot kantenji patterns

In the Japanese kantenji braille, the standard 8-dot Braille patterns 367, 1367, 3467, and 13467 are the patterns related to Braille pattern dots-235, since the two additional dots of kantenji patterns 0235, 2357, and 02357 are placed above the base 6-dot cell, instead of below, as in standard 8-dot braille.

Kantenji using braille patterns 367, 1367, 3467, or 13467

This listing includes kantenji using Braille pattern dots-235 for all 6349 kanji found in JIS C 6226-1978.

  - 語

Variants and thematic compounds

  -  selector 1 + ゑ/訁  =  叉
  -  selector 4 + ゑ/訁  =  又
  -  ゑ/訁 + selector 4  =  詠

Compounds of 語 and 訁

  -  け/犬 + ゑ/訁  =  獄
  -  や/疒 + ゑ/訁  =  嶽
  -  ひ/辶 + ゑ/訁  =  這
  -  ゑ/訁 + ろ/十  =  訊
  -  ゑ/訁 + か/金  =  訓
  -  ゑ/訁 + こ/子  =  訟
  -  ゑ/訁 + て/扌  =  訣
  -  ゑ/訁 + た/⽥  =  訳
  -  ゑ/訁 + ゑ/訁 + た/⽥  =  譯
  -  ゑ/訁 + を/貝  =  訴
  -  ゑ/訁 + う/宀/#3  =  診
  -  ゑ/訁 + い/糹/#2  =  証
  -  ゑ/訁 + ゑ/訁 + い/糹/#2  =  證
  -  ゑ/訁 + に/氵  =  詣
  -  ゑ/訁 + 囗  =  試
  -  ゑ/訁 + し/巿  =  詩
  -  ゑ/訁 + な/亻  =  詫
  -  ゑ/訁 + り/分  =  詮
  -  ゑ/訁 + れ/口  =  詰
  -  ゑ/訁 + ゐ/幺  =  該
  -  ゑ/訁 + そ/馬  =  詳
  -  ゑ/訁 + 宿  =  誂
  -  ゑ/訁 + 心  =  誌
  -  ゑ/訁 + ぬ/力  =  認
  -  ゑ/訁 + は/辶  =  誨
  -  ゑ/訁 + 火  =  誹
  -  ゑ/訁 + つ/土  =  調
  -  ゑ/訁 + せ/食  =  請
  -  ゑ/訁 + ひ/辶  =  諌
  -  ゑ/訁 + ゆ/彳  =  諛
  -  ゑ/訁 + ん/止  =  諮
  -  ゑ/訁 + ま/石  =  諳
  -  ゑ/訁 + 日  =  諸
  -  心 + ゑ/訁 + 日  =  藷
  -  ゑ/訁 + る/忄  =  謀
  -  ゑ/訁 + ほ/方  =  謗
  -  ゑ/訁 + け/犬  =  謙
  -  ゑ/訁 + む/車  =  講
  -  ゑ/訁 + き/木  =  謹
  -  ゑ/訁 + み/耳  =  譲
  -  ゑ/訁 + ゑ/訁 + み/耳  =  讓
  -  ゑ/訁 + 数  =  讐
  -  ゑ/訁 + 比 + ひ/辶  =  諫
  -  う/宀/#3 + 宿 + ゑ/訁  =  謇
  -  ゑ/訁 + 宿 + 数  =  讎

Compounds of 叉

  -  む/車 + ゑ/訁  =  蚤
  -  て/扌 + selector 1 + ゑ/訁  =  扠
  -  か/金 + selector 1 + ゑ/訁  =  釵
  -  と/戸 + selector 1 + ゑ/訁  =  靫

Compounds of 又

  -  仁/亻 + ゑ/訁  =  侵
  -  ぬ/力 + ゑ/訁  =  努
  -  ろ/十 + ゑ/訁  =  友
  -  の/禾 + ろ/十 + ゑ/訁  =  秡
  -  み/耳 + ろ/十 + ゑ/訁  =  跋
  -  し/巿 + ろ/十 + ゑ/訁  =  黻
  -  ゑ/訁 + ゑ/訁  =  双
  -  へ/⺩ + ゑ/訁  =  収
  -  へ/⺩ + へ/⺩ + ゑ/訁  =  收
  -  う/宀/#3 + ゑ/訁  =  叔
  -  な/亻 + う/宀/#3 + ゑ/訁  =  俶
  -  心 + う/宀/#3 + ゑ/訁  =  椒
  -  み/耳 + ゑ/訁  =  取
  -  ふ/女 + み/耳 + ゑ/訁  =  娶
  -  て/扌 + み/耳 + ゑ/訁  =  掫
  -  え/訁 + み/耳 + ゑ/訁  =  諏
  -  む/車 + み/耳 + ゑ/訁  =  輙
  -  さ/阝 + み/耳 + ゑ/訁  =  陬
  -  そ/馬 + み/耳 + ゑ/訁  =  驟
  -  龸 + ゑ/訁  =  受
  -  ゐ/幺 + 龸 + ゑ/訁  =  綬
  -  り/分 + ゑ/訁  =  叙
  -  selector 1 + り/分 + ゑ/訁  =  敍
  -  り/分 + り/分 + ゑ/訁  =  敘
  -  め/目 + ゑ/訁  =  叡
  -  き/木 + ゑ/訁  =  叢
  -  れ/口 + ゑ/訁  =  啜
  -  ふ/女 + ゑ/訁  =  奴
  -  れ/口 + ふ/女 + ゑ/訁  =  呶
  -  こ/子 + ふ/女 + ゑ/訁  =  孥
  -  し/巿 + ふ/女 + ゑ/訁  =  帑
  -  ゆ/彳 + ふ/女 + ゑ/訁  =  弩
  -  て/扌 + ふ/女 + ゑ/訁  =  拏
  -  そ/馬 + ふ/女 + ゑ/訁  =  駑
  -  宿 + ゑ/訁  =  寝
  -  宿 + 宿 + ゑ/訁  =  寢
  -  よ/广 + ゑ/訁  =  度
  -  に/氵 + ゑ/訁  =  渡
  -  か/金 + よ/广 + ゑ/訁  =  鍍
  -  て/扌 + ゑ/訁  =  抜
  -  て/扌 + て/扌 + ゑ/訁  =  拔
  -  日 + ゑ/訁  =  最
  -  き/木 + 日 + ゑ/訁  =  樶
  -  心 + ゑ/訁  =  桑
  -  つ/土 + ゑ/訁  =  殻
  -  る/忄 + つ/土 + ゑ/訁  =  愨
  -  つ/土 + つ/土 + ゑ/訁  =  殼
  -  氷/氵 + ゑ/訁  =  浸
  -  た/⽥ + ゑ/訁  =  畷
  -  ね/示 + ゑ/訁  =  祓
  -  ゐ/幺 + ゑ/訁  =  綴
  -  ⺼ + ゑ/訁  =  腎
  -  も/門 + ゑ/訁  =  警
  -  は/辶 + ゑ/訁  =  趣
  -  い/糹/#2 + ゑ/訁  =  隻
  -  め/目 + い/糹/#2 + ゑ/訁  =  矍
  -  せ/食 + ゑ/訁  =  餐
  -  お/頁 + ゑ/訁  =  魃
  -  う/宀/#3 + selector 4 + ゑ/訁  =  攴
  -  火 + selector 4 + ゑ/訁  =  燮
  -  ゑ/訁 + ゑ/訁 + ゑ/訁  =  雙
  -  ふ/女 + 龸 + ゑ/訁  =  娵
  -  ゑ/訁 + 宿 + そ/馬  =  聚
  -  心 + 宿 + ゑ/訁  =  菽
  -  む/車 + 宿 + ゑ/訁  =  輟
  -  か/金 + 宿 + ゑ/訁  =  錣
  -  そ/馬 + 宿 + ゑ/訁  =  馭

Other compounds

  -  さ/阝 + ゑ/訁  =  陰
  -  く/艹 + さ/阝 + ゑ/訁  =  蔭
  -  そ/馬 + ゑ/訁  =  駁

Notes

Braille patterns